Roy Montgomery (born 1959) is a composer, guitarist and lecturer from Christchurch, New Zealand. Montgomery's mostly instrumental solo works have elements of post-rock, lo-fi, folk and avant-garde experimentation. His signature sound might be described as atmospheric or cinematic, often featuring complex layers of chiming, echoing and/or droning guitar phrases. He is currently head of the Environmental management department at Lincoln University in New Zealand.

Montgomery has played in several New Zealand bands since 1980, most notably The Pin Group, Dadamah, Dissolve and Hash Jar Tempo. He has also released solo albums on labels including Kranky and Drunken Fish.

Biography 
Montgomery was born in 1959 in London, England and moved with his family to Cologne in Germany where he lived until the age of four. His father was German and his mother was from the UK. As his mother worked for the British Forces Broadcasting Service, Montgomery was exposed mostly to the pop music of the United States rather than the music of Germany. In mid-sixties he moved with his mother to Christchurch, New Zealand. In 1980, he formed The Pin Group with bass player Ross Humphries and drummer Peter Stapleton. The group debuted with the single Ambivalence in 1981, released through the newly founded label Flying Nun Records. They recorded a handful of singles and performed only locally before disbanding in January 1982. Montgomery later worked with Stapleton again in Dadamah, formed in 1990.

Montgomery had been composing and recording acoustic work since 1982, much of which he would integrate into his 1990s work. Although he enjoys collaborating with other artists, Montgomery is mostly drawn to working alone, which he attributes to growing up as an only child. In 1995 he issued his debut solo effort Scenes from the South Island, which he recorded and performed by himself.

Montgomery completed a master's thesis titled "Thou shalt take into account the principles of the Treaty of Waitangi and/or consider Maori cultural, traditional, and spiritual values": implications for research management at Lincoln University in 1990.

Discography

Albums 
 Scenes from the South Island (Drunken Fish, 1995)
 Temple IV (Kranky, 1996)
 And Now the Rain Sounds Like Life Is Falling Down Through It (Drunken Fish, 1998)
 The Allegory of Hearing (Drunken Fish, 2000)
 Silver Wheel of Prayer (VHF, 2001)
 Music from the Film Hey Badfinger (Yellow Electric, 2012)
 RMHQ: Headquarters (Grapefruit, 2016)
 Suffuse (Grapefruit, 2018)
 Refuse (Grapefruit, 2018)
 Island of Lost Souls (Grapefruit, 2021)
 Rhymes of Chance (Grapefruit, 2021)
 That Best Forgotten Work (Grapefruit, 2021)
 Audiotherapy (Grapefruit, 2022)

Compilations 
324 E. 13th Street #7 (Drunken Fish, 1999)
Inroads: New and Collected Works (Rebis, 2007)
324 E. 13th Street #7 (Yellow Electric, 2014)

Collaborations
with Kim Pieters and Peter Stapleton and Janine Stagg as Dadamah: This is not a Dream (Majora, 1992)
with Kim Pieters and Peter Stapleton and Janine Stagg as Dadamah: This is not a Dream (Kranky, 1995)
with Chris Heaphy as Dissolve: That that is, is (not) (Kranky, 1995)
with Chris Heaphy as Dissolve: Third Album for the Sun (Kranky, 1997)
with Bardo Pond as Hash Jar Tempo: Well Oiled (Drunken Fish, 1997)
with Bardo Pond as Hash Jar Tempo: Under Glass (Drunken Fish, 1999)
with Flying Saucer Attack: Goodbye (VHF, 1996)
with Chris Heaphy: True (Kranky, 1999)
with Grouper: Roy Montgomery/Grouper (Root Strata, 2010)
with Nick Guy: Torlesse Super Group (Rebis, 2011)

References

External links

Artist page at the kranky record label website
Roy Montgomery's staff profile page at Lincoln University, Christchurch.

Experimental rock musicians
Psychedelic folk musicians
Psychedelic rock musicians
People from Christchurch
Living people
1959 births
Drunken Fish Records artists
Rocket Girl artists